Fundeni is a commune in Galați County, Western Moldavia, Romania with a population of 3,923 people. It is composed of four villages: Fundeni, Fundenii Noi, Hanu Conachi and Lungoci.

Natives
 Silvia Cambir

References

Communes in Galați County
Localities in Western Moldavia